The following lists events that happened during 1997 in Cape Verde.

Incumbents
President: António Mascarenhas Monteiro
Prime Minister: Carlos Veiga

Events
Cape Verde ratified the UN treaty, the International Convention on the Protection of the Rights of All Migrant Workers and Members of Their Families
October 5: Museu Etnográfico da Praia (Praia Ethnographic Museum) first opened

Arts and entertainment
March 18: Cesária Évora's album Cabo Verde released
May: National television channel TCV was established

Sports
Sporting Clube da Praia won the Cape Verdean Football Championship

Births
23 February: Márcio Rosa, footballer
15 July: Erin Pinheiro, footballer

References

 
Years of the 20th century in Cape Verde
1990s in Cape Verde
Cape Verde
Cape Verde